Cristian Rafael Techera Cribelli (born May 31, 1992) is a Uruguayan footballer who plays as a forward for Ayacucho FC.

Career
Techera began his career in 2010 with River Plate Montevideo, where he played for five seasons.

He was loaned out to Major League Soccer club Vancouver Whitecaps FC on April 9, 2015. Techera signed permanently with Vancouver on January 4, 2016.

Style of play
Upon signing the player on loan in 2015, former Vancouver Whitecaps coach Carl Robinson described Techera as "a quick natural winger, who can play on both sides of the pitch. He has great technical ability and will excite in the attacking third." His MLS Profile describes him as "a technical, speedy winger capable of both scoring and setting up his teammates. The Uruguayan makes up for his small frame with speed and an ability to withstand physical play from opposing defenders." A diminutive midfielder or forward, his nickname is "the bug," due to his small stature.

Honours
Vancouver Whitecaps
 Canadian Championship: 2015

External links

Whitecaps FC profile

References

1992 births
Living people
Association football forwards
Uruguayan footballers
Uruguayan expatriate footballers
Footballers from Paysandú
Major League Soccer players
Uruguayan Primera División players
Argentine Primera División players
Primera Nacional players
Peruvian Primera División players
Vancouver Whitecaps FC players
Club Atlético River Plate (Montevideo) players
Club Atlético Belgrano footballers
Atenas de San Carlos players
Ayacucho FC footballers
Uruguayan expatriate sportspeople in Canada
Uruguayan expatriate sportspeople in Argentina
Uruguayan expatriate sportspeople in Peru
Expatriate soccer players in Canada
Expatriate footballers in Argentina
Expatriate footballers in Peru